Alikulikyand may refer to:
 Hartashen, Syunik, Armenia
 Əliquluuşağı, Azerbaijan